Comin' On Strong is the sixth studio album by American country music artist Trace Adkins. It was released on December 2, 2003 on Capitol Records Nashville. The album produced two singles — "Hot Mama" and "Rough & Ready", which respectively reached No. 5 and No. 13 on the US Billboard Hot Country Songs charts. The album was certified platinum by the RIAA.

The track "I'd Sure Hate to Break Down Here" was later recorded by Julie Roberts as "Break Down Here" on her self-titled debut album. Her version was released as a single in early 2004, peaking at No. 18 on the country charts.

The song "Hot Mama" also appears on the game Karaoke Revolution Party.

Track listing

Personnel
As listed in liner notes.

Trace Adkins – lead vocals
Mike Brignardello – bass guitar
Trey Bruce – percussion, programming
Pat Buchanan – electric guitar, harmonica
Lisa Cochran – background vocals
J. T. Corenflos – electric guitar
Vicki Hampton – background vocals
Aubrey Haynie – fiddle, mandolin
Wes Hightower – background vocals
Steve Hinson – pedal steel guitar, lap steel guitar
Liana Manis – background vocals
Greg Morrow – drums, shaker
Gordon Mote – piano, Hammond B-3 organ, Wurlitzer electric piano, synthesizer, synthesizer strings
Alison Prestwood – bass guitar
Michael Spriggs – acoustic guitar, Dobro
Jonathan Yudkin – fiddle, mandolin, banjo, cello

Chart performance

Weekly charts

Year-end charts

Singles

Certifications

References

2003 albums
Trace Adkins albums
Capitol Records albums
Albums produced by Scott Hendricks